Michael Everett Arch Parrott (born December 6, 1954), nicknamed "Bird," is a former Major League Baseball pitcher. Parrott graduated from Adolfo Camarillo High School in Camarillo, California in 1973. He was drafted by the Baltimore Orioles in the first round (15th overall) of the 1973 Major League Baseball draft. During a five-year baseball career, he pitched for the Orioles (1977) and the Seattle Mariners (1977–81). 

A minor league pitching coach for over 30 years, Parrott served as the pitching coach of the Kane County Cougars, the Class-A affiliate of the Arizona Diamondbacks, in 2019. This followed several years in the same position with the Hillsboro Hops. He is now a roving instructor in the D-Backs' system.

Professional career
He was called up later that year by the Orioles, and in three games, he gave up just one earned run (2.08 ERA).

Parrott was traded from the Orioles to the Mariners for Carlos Lopez and Tommy Moore at the Winter Meetings on December 7, . In , Parrott won a career high 14 games and recorded a 3.77 ERA in 38 games (30 starts) for the Mariners. He also led all Seattle pitchers in wins that year. On March 5, he was traded by the Mariners to the Milwaukee Brewers for Thad Bosley. He never made a Major League roster after this.

In 1993, Parrott was named to the Ventura County Sports Hall of Fame.

References

External links

Mike Partott at Baseball Almanac

1954 births
Living people
Baltimore Orioles players
Seattle Mariners players
Major League Baseball pitchers
Sportspeople from Oxnard, California
Bluefield Orioles players
Lodi Orioles players
Asheville Orioles players
Rochester Red Wings players
Charlotte O's players
Miami Orioles players
Spokane Indians players
Jacksonville Suns players
Omaha Royals players
Oklahoma City 89ers players
Baseball players from California
Minor league baseball coaches
Hillsboro Hops